St John the Baptist Church is a former Anglican church in Christchurch, New Zealand. It was located on Latimer Square. The church is today known as Latimer Church and meets in St Albans. 

It was founded in 1864.

It was severely damaged during the 2011 Christchurch earthquake and subsequently demolished.

On its section the Transitional Cathedral out of cardboard by the architect Shigeru Ban was constructed.

References

External links 

Heritage New Zealand Category 1 historic places in Canterbury, New Zealand
Religious buildings and structures in Christchurch
20th-century Anglican church buildings
Anglican churches in New Zealand
Buildings and structures demolished as a result of the 2011 Christchurch earthquake
Christchurch Central City
Former churches in New Zealand
Listed churches in New Zealand
1860s architecture in New Zealand
Stone churches in New Zealand